The 1st Georgia Cavalry Regiment was a cavalry regiment in the Confederate States Army, during the American Civil War. 

It fought from 1862 to 1865, and mostly served in the Army of Tennessee.

Service
In late 1861 the 1st Georgia Cavalry assembled at Rome, Georgia, and was mustered into the Confederate States Army on May 28, 1862. 

Sent to Tennessee it served in the Department of East Tennessee, until assigned to the Army of Tennessee. 

For the duration of the civil war it switched between these two for numerous times; the only change being a stint with the Department of South Carolina, Georgia, and Florida in early 1865, before returning to the AoT. 

It was surrendered as part of this army at Bennett Place in North Carolina on April 26, 1865; fielding less than 50 men.

Commanders
Col. James J. Morrison
Col. Samuel W. Davitte
Ltc. Armistead R. Harper
Ltc. James H. Strickland
Maj. John W. Trench
Ltc. George T. Watts

See also
List of Georgia Confederate Civil War regiments

References

Further reading

Units and formations of the Confederate States Army from Georgia (U.S. state)
1862 establishments in Georgia (U.S. state)